Tchindas is a 2015 Spanish-Cape Verdean documentary film directed by Pablo García Pérez de Lara and Marc Serena.  The film premiered at the Outfest Los Angeles 2015 where it received a Grand Jury Award.

Plot 
In the Atlantic Ocean, the tiny island of São Vicente works together to make something beautiful out of nothing: a Carnival. During the month leading up to the festivities we'll discover the struggles needed to achieve it through a person that coined a word: Tchinda.

It is shot in the most gay-friendly African country, Cape Verde, according to Afrobarometer's 2016 report.

Cast
 Tchinda Andrade as herself
 Elvis Tolentino as himself
 Edinha Pitanga as herself

Recognition
The Hollywood Reporter praised the film, writing it was "a beautifully shot vérité chronicle of the all-consuming Carnival preparations on São Vicente". Tchindas picked up six awards in the five festivals which until now has been presented in competition: the Outfest, the Chicago Reeling LGBT Film Festival, MiradasDoc, and LesGaiCineMad. It has also been screened at Seminci and is in competition at the In-Edit and View São Paulo International Film Festival.  The African Artists’ Association praised the film for its story, background, and depth, writing that it showed "a vivid sense of place, community and personalities [that] comes through in the keenly observed film by Pablo Garcia Perez de Lara and Marc Serena, which reveals a seamless fusion of tradition and open-hearted acceptance." Chicago Reader praised the project and wrote of the film and its subject.

Reception
Of the film's screening at the REELING:Chicago LGBTQ+ International Film Festival, the Windy City Times stated it was a "Documentary Centerpiece" and referred to it as "a glittery, oh-so-fabulous examination of a little-seen culture reminiscent of Paris Is Burning".

Awards and nomination
 2015, won Outfest's Grand Jury Award for 'Excellence in Filmmaking'

See also
List of lesbian, gay, bisexual or transgender-related films of 2015

References

External links
 
 

2015 films
Spanish independent films
2015 LGBT-related films
Regal Entertainment films
Catalan-language films
2010s Spanish-language films
Spanish LGBT-related films
Cape Verdean LGBT-related films
Transgender-related documentary films
Cape Verdean documentary films
Spanish documentary films